Aenictus brevipodus is a species of ant in the Dorylinae subfamily. It was first described in 2013 by Weeyawat Jaitrong and Seiki Yamane.

References

Insects described in 2013
Dorylinae